Regenerator 3017 is the fifteenth studio album by Djam Karet, released on February 25, 2014 by HC Productions.

Track listing

Personnel 
Adapted from Regenerator 3017 liner notes.

Djam Karet
 Gayle Ellett – electric guitar, Greek bouzouki, Rhodes piano, Moog synthesizer, Solina String Ensemble, mellotron, tape, production, mixing, mastering
 Mike Henderson – electric guitar, percussion
 Chuck Oken, Jr. – drums, percussion, keyboards, electronics
 Henry J. Osborne – bass guitar, piano, percussion

Additional musicians
 Mark Cook – Warr Guitar (2)
 Mike Murray – electric guitar

Release history

References

External links 
 Regenerator 3017 at Discogs (list of releases)
 Regenerator 3017 at Bandcamp

2014 albums
Djam Karet albums